Point Mugu State Park is a state park located in the Santa Monica Mountains National Recreation Area in Southern California. The rugged, nearly impassible shoreline of the western Santa Monica Mountains gives way to tidal lagoons and coastal sand dunes at Mugu Rock. The western edge of the park adjoins Mugu Lagoon which is a protected area within Naval Air Station Point Mugu.

Point Mugu SP consists of distinct landside and beachside areas with different ecosystems and their own parking lots, separated by the Pacific Coast Highway. During low tide, the parks are joined by a walkway under an adjoining bridge. The park may be accessed from the eastern part of the Santa Monica Mountains from a National Park Service park, Rancho Sierra Vista in Newbury Park, California that includes the Satwiwa Native American Indian Culture Center, and from the western part of the Santa Monica Mountains by the Pacific Coast Highway.

Features 
Point Mugu State Park features  of oceanfront beaches, palisades, chaparral-covered mountains, two major canyons with seasonal rivers, grassy valleys highlighted with oaks, sycamores, and the occasional native walnuts trees. A major landmark, the Boney Mountain State Wilderness Area features pinnacles visible from many areas of the park.

Recreation 

Opportunities for camping, hiking, swimming, mountain biking, picnicking, wildlife viewing, and horseback riding exist within the park. Horseback riding is available from the National Park Service entrance. Like all California State Parks, dogs are permitted when leashed in campsite areas. No dogs are allowed whether on or off-leash on the backcountry trails, i.e., any trail that is not paved. Sycamore Cove, La Jolla Beach and Mugu Beach have parking and sandy beaches. Views of dolphins, seals, pelicans, and whales are possible all along Pacific Coast Highway. No fishing .

Geography

Canyons and valleys
Wood Canyon
Sycamore Canyon
La Jolla Valley
Serrano Valley

Mountains
Boney Mountain — Boney Mountain Wilderness area, Boney Peak adjacent
Tri Peaks
Mugu Peak
Laguna Peak

See also
List of beaches in California
List of California state parks

References

External links

Official Point Mugu State Park website

State parks of California
Santa Monica Mountains National Recreation Area
Parks in Ventura County, California
Beaches of Southern California
Nature reserves in California
Regional parks in California
Geography of Oxnard, California
Santa Monica Mountains
Beaches of Ventura County, California